{{DISPLAYTITLE:C17H20N2O5S}}
The molecular formula C17H20N2O5S (molar mass: 364.41 g/mol, exact mass: 364.1093 u) may refer to:

 Bumetanide
 Pheneticillin

Molecular formulas